Russel Carrero Trejos (12 December 1950 – 10 June 1990) was a Nicaraguan sprinter. She competed in the women's 100 metres at the 1972 Summer Olympics. She was the first woman to represent Nicaragua at the Olympics.

References

1950 births
1990 deaths
Athletes (track and field) at the 1971 Pan American Games
Athletes (track and field) at the 1972 Summer Olympics
Nicaraguan female sprinters
Olympic athletes of Nicaragua
People from Chinandega
Pan American Games competitors for Nicaragua
Olympic female sprinters